Rudolph II (c. 11 July 880 – 11 July 937), a member of the Elder House of Welf, was King of Burgundy from 912 until his death. He initially succeeded in Upper Burgundy and also ruled as King of Italy from 922 to 926. In 933 Rudolph acquired the Kingdom of Lower Burgundy (Provence) from King Hugh of Italy in exchange for the waiver of his claims to the Italian crown, thereby establishing the united Kingdom of Burgundy.

Life

He was the son of the Upper Burgundian king Rudolph I and Guilla. Following his ascent to the throne in 912, Rudolph II entered into a border conflict with the neighbouring dukes of Swabia and campaigned the Thurgau and Zurich estates. Duke Burchard II of Swabia finally defeated him in the 919 Battle of Winterthur; both rulers made peace and Rudolph married Burchard's daughter Bertha in 922.

At the same time, Rudolph was asked by several Italian nobles led by Margrave Adalbert I of Ivrea to intervene in Italy on their behalf against Emperor Berengar. Having entered Italy, he was crowned king at Pavia in the Basilica of San Michele Maggiore. In 923, he defeated Berengar at the Battle of Firenzuola; Berengar was murdered the following year, possibly at the instigation of Rudolph. The king then ruled Upper Burgundy and Italy together, residing alternately in both kingdoms.

However, in 926 the Italian nobility turned against him and requested that Hugh of Arles, the effective ruler of Provence (or Lower Burgundy), rule them instead. Rudolph's father-in-law Duke Burchard II of Swabia came for his support; however, he was attacked and killed near Novara by the henchmen of Archbishop Lambert of Milan. The king returned to Upper Burgundy to protect himself, assuring Hugh's coronation as King of Italy in the process. At the Diet of Worms, Rudolph rendered the royal symbol of the Holy Lance to the East Frankish king Henry the Fowler in exchange for the Swabian Basel estates. 

The two Burgundian kingdoms unified from 933; Rudolph ruled until his death in 937 and was succeeded by his son Conrad. After his death in 937, his daughter Adelaide was married to Hugh's son Lothair, while Hugh married Rudolph's widow Bertha. Adelaide later became the second wife of Otto the Great, crowned Holy Roman Emperor in 962, and the mother of Emperor Otto II.

Notes

References

Sources

 

880s births
937 deaths
10th-century kings of Italy
Frankish warriors
Kings of Burgundy
Elder House of Welf
Year of birth unknown